The Tuck Baronetcy, of Park Crescent in Metropolitan Borough of St Marylebone, is a title in the Baronetage of the United Kingdom. It was created on 19 July 1910 for Adolph Tuck. He was chairman and managing director of Raphael Tuck & Sons Ltd., makers of Christmas cards, picture postcards, et cetera. The Tuck family is of German-Jewish origin. The first Baronet's father Raphael Tuck was born in Prussia and emigrated to the United Kingdom in 1865.

Tuck baronets, of Park Crescent (1910)
Sir Adolph Tuck, 1st Baronet (1854–1926)
Sir (William) Reginald Tuck, 2nd Baronet (1883–1954)
Sir Bruce Adolph Reginald Tuck, 3rd Baronet (1926–2020)
Sir Christopher John Tuck, 4th Baronet (b. 1954)

Their no known heir to baronetcy.

Notes

References
Kidd, Charles, Williamson, David (editors). Debrett's Peerage and Baronetage (1990 edition). New York: St Martin's Press, 1990.

External links
History of Raphael Tuck and Sons at emotionscards.com
History of Raphael Tuck and Sons at henrywimbush.co.uk

Tuck